Pop, Dick and Harry was a long-lasting British comic strip series published in the magazine The Beezer from 1956 until 1990. It was drawn by Tom Bannister from its inception until 1981, after which Peter Moonie drew it until 1987. Brian Walker then continued the series for another three years. Pop, Dick and Harry was the only comic strip that ran in The Beezer from the first until the last issue.

Concept
Pop, Dick and Harry was a gag-a-day comic about two twins, Dick and Harry, who always engaged in bad behavior and disobeyed and tormented their overweight father, Pop.

External links

The Beezer's Golden Years
 Date sources : The Book of the Beezer - by Ray Moore 1997 CJ publications

British comics
1956 comics debuts
Comics characters introduced in 1956
1990 comics endings
Fictional twins
Fictional families
Fictional tricksters
Child characters in comics
Works about twin brothers
British comics characters
Gag-a-day comics
DC Thomson Comics strips